Arthur Ripstein (born 12 June 1958) is a Canadian philosopher and Professor of Law and Philosophy and University Professor at the University of Toronto where he is Howard Beck QC Chair in law.
He is known for his works on Kantian philosophy and is a winner of Izaak Walton Killam Memorial Prize.

Books
Private Wrongs (Harvard University Press, 2016)
 Rules for Wrongdoers (Oxford University Press, 2021)
 Kant and the Law of War (Oxford University Press, 2021) 
 Force and Freedom: Kant's Legal and Political Philosophy (Harvard University Press, 2009)
 Equality, Responsibility and the Law (Cambridge University Press, 1998)

References

21st-century Canadian philosophers
Philosophy academics
Living people
Academic staff of the University of Toronto
Political philosophers
Kant scholars
1958 births